is a village located in Ōshima Subprefecture, Tokyo Metropolis, Japan. , the village had an estimated population of 2,697, and a population density of 97.9 persons per km².

Geography
The village of Niijima consists of the inhabited islands of Nii-jima and Shikinejima, the uninhabited islands of Udoneshima and Jinai-tō, and numerous small rocks in the northern Izu archipelago.

Climate

Surrounding Municipalities
Tokyo Metropolis
Kōzushima, Tokyo
Hachijō, Tokyo

History
On October 1, 1923, the islands of Niijima and Shikinejima were organized into municipalities. Both villages belonged to Ōshima Island Government Office. In 1926, the Ōshima Island Government Office became Ōshima Subprefecture of Tokyo. On November 1, 1954, Niijimahon absorbed the village of Wakagō, and changed its name to Niijima Village on April 1, 1992.

Economy
The economy of the village is dependent on commercial fishing and seasonal tourism. The village is known for its sports fishing, hot spring resorts) and local beer.

Transportation
Airports
Niijima Airport at Niijima
Airlines
New Central Airlines operates the route between Niijima and Chōfu Airport 4 laps a day. Single trip takes 40 minutes.
Roads
National highways: None
Metropolitan highways:
211 Wakagō Niijima-kō Line
237 Shikinejima Circle Line
Ports
Niijima: Port of Niijima
Shikinejima: Port of Nobushi, Fishing Port of Nobushi, Port of Shikinejima, Fishing Port of Ashitsuki, Fishing Port of Kobama
Sea routes
Between Niijima and Nobushi
Camellia-maru by Tōkai Kisen links between Tokyo, Yokohama (on Friday and Saturday), Izu Ōshima, Toshima, and Niijima.
Jinshin Kisen links between Shimoda, Toshima, Niijima, Shikinejima, Kōzushima, and Shimoda. A ship runs this direction on Sunday, Tuesday, and Friday. It goes backwards on Monday, Thursday, and Saturday.
Nishiki 2 by Niijima Village links between Niijima and Shikinejima 3 laps a day.
Cargo ships by Niijima Bussan and Izu Shichitō Kaiun links between the islands and mainland Tokyo.

Education
High schools 
 (operated by the Tokyo Metropolitan Board of Education)
 Junior High Schools
Niijima Junior High School (新島中学校)
Shikinejima Junior High School (式根島中学校)
Elementary Schools
Niijima Elementary School (新島小学校)
Shikinejima Elementary School (式根島小学校)

References

External links

Niijima Village Official Website 

Villages of Tokyo
Populated coastal places in Japan
Izu Islands